Aurelio Archinti or Aurelius Archinto (1588 – 16 September 1622) was a Roman Catholic prelate who served as Bishop of Como (1621–1622).

Biography
Aurelio Archinto was born in 1588 in Italy.
On 7 June 1621, he was appointed during the papacy of Pope Gregory XV as Bishop of Como.
On 11 July 1621, he was consecrated bishop by Ludovico Ludovisi, Archbishop of Bologna with Galeazzo Sanvitale, Archbishop Emeritus of Bari, and Ulpiano Volpi, Bishop of Novara, serving as co-consecrators. 
He served as Bishop of Como until his death on 16 September 1622.

References

External links and additional sources
 (for Chronology of Bishops) 
 (for Chronology of Bishops) 

17th-century Italian Roman Catholic bishops
Bishops appointed by Pope Gregory XV
1588 births
1622 deaths